Giovanny Bariani Marques (born 19 September 1997), simply known as Giovanny, is a Brazilian professional footballer who plays as a forward for Bulgarian First League side Lokomotiv Plovdiv.

References

External links

1997 births
Living people
Footballers from São Paulo
Brazilian footballers
Association football midfielders
Campeonato Brasileiro Série A players
Campeonato Brasileiro Série C players
Guaratinguetá Futebol players
Associação Atlética Ponte Preta players
Club Athletico Paranaense players
Paraná Clube players
Goiás Esporte Clube players